Camp Runamuck is an American sitcom that aired on NBC during the 1965–66 television season. The series was created and executive produced by David Swift, and aired for 26 episodes.

Synopsis
The series related the wacky goings-on at the titular boys' summer camp, and at Camp Divine, its girls' counterpart across the lake. Runamuck was run by Commander Wivenhoe (Arch Johnson), a man who couldn't stand kids, and senior counselor Spiffy (David Ketchum), his assistant of sorts.

Helping them out were counselor Pruett (Dave Madden), Doc Joslyn, and camp cook Malden (Mike Wagner). Eulalia Divine (Hermione Baddeley) was the owner of the girls' camp, which was run by chief counselor Mahalia May Gruenecker (Alice Nunn). Nina Wayne (younger sister of Carol) played Camp Divine's curvaceous counsellor Caprice Yeudleman. The competitiveness between the two camps and the incidents and accidents that would normally occur at such summer camps - missing kids, people falling into the lake, food poisoning, and so on - formed the basis of most of the show's plots.

The series was scheduled opposite CBS's The Wild Wild West and ABC's The Flintstones and struggled in the ratings. The series was canceled after 26 episodes, with the last new episode airing on April 15, 1966. Reruns aired on NBC until September 2, 1966.

Production notes
Composer and bandleader Frank DeVol (who also wrote the series' theme song) played the part of Doc Joslyn in the pilot episode, but illness forced him to quit the role, and he was replaced by Leonard Stone for the actual series. DeVol's original theme song was performed by Bobby Darin.  Hugo Montenegro provided a new theme song and score to the episodes.

In April 1966, Dell Comics issued a Camp Runamuck comic book.

Some of the characters on that show were based on some of the names described in the song "Hello Muddah, Hello Fadduh" by Allan Sherman, including Joe Spivey.

Cast
 Arch Johnson as Commander Wivenhoe
 David Ketchum as Senior Counsellor Spiffy 
 Dave Madden as Counselor Pruett 
 Frank De Vol as Doc Joslyn (1) 
 Leonard Stone as Doc Joslyn (2) 
 Mike Wagner as Camp Cook Malden 
 Hermione Baddeley as Eulalia Divine
 Alice Nunn as Mahalia May Gruenecker 
 Nina Wayne as Caprice Yeudleman 
 George Dunn as The Sheriff

Episodes

Syndication
The series aired in the UK by the BBC on Saturday mornings 10 years after it aired in the United States. (Although this was the first network UK screening of Camp Runamuck, the series was aired by some ITV regional stations in 1969). In the United States, it briefly ran on Nickelodeon and Comedy Central.

Approximately half of the series became available on streaming service Crackle in 2021.

References

External links

  
Behind-the-scenes production photos Collection of Stephen Lodge.

1965 American television series debuts
1966 American television series endings
1960s American sitcoms
English-language television shows
NBC original programming
Television series about summer camps
Television series by Screen Gems